Alice Kimetto Chelangat (born 27 December 1976 in Kericho) is a Kenyan long-distance runner who specializes in the marathon race.

Biography
She represented her country in the event at the 2004 Olympic Games. She also competes in cross country running and won the team silver medal with Kenya at the 2006 IAAF World Cross Country Championships.

She is a two-time winner of the Rock 'n' Roll San Diego Marathon and has won the Milan Marathon and Florence Marathon in Italy. Her personal best for the marathon distance is 2:26:36 hours, set in 2001.

Championship record

Road races

Personal bests
10,000 metres - 32:49.6 min (2001)
Half marathon - 1:09:10 hrs (2002)
Marathon - 2:26:36 hrs (2001)

References

External links
 
 Marathoninfo profile

1976 births
Living people
People from Kericho County
Kenyan female long-distance runners
Kenyan female marathon runners
Athletes (track and field) at the 2004 Summer Olympics
Olympic athletes of Kenya
Kenyan female cross country runners
21st-century Kenyan women